Jiří Rychnovský (1545, Rychnov nad Kněžnou – 1616, Chrudim) was a Czech composer of the Renaissance and early Baroque era. He was the mayor of Chrudim. His musical work consists of Czech and Latin sacred music with advanced vocal polyphony, revealing a knowledge of European designs, but also the efforts of self-expression. His compositions have been recorded in manuscripts of the Literary Society in St. Michael in New Town in Prague. It is one of the few surviving complete collections of Czech Renaissance sacred music. He usually wrote under his Latin name Georgius Rychnovinus.

References 
Malá encyklopedie hudby (dr. Jar. Smolka; & kolektiv, Supraphon 1983) – in Czech

1545 births
1616 deaths
16th-century Bohemian people
16th-century composers
17th-century Bohemian people
17th-century classical composers
Czech Baroque composers
Czech male classical composers
Renaissance composers
17th-century male musicians